Elections to Liverpool Town Council were held on Saturday 26 December 1835.

This was the first election to Liverpool Town Council.  It was conducted under the provisions of
the Municipal Corporations Act 1835.  As this was the first election to the Council, all three seats for each of the sixteen wards were up for election. The candidate in each ward with the highest number of votes was elected for three years, the candidate with the second highest number of votes was elected for two years and the candidate with the third highest number of votes was elected for one year.  All of the sixteen wards were contested.

The terms Whig and Reformer are used interchangeably. The local press, at the time, referred exclusively to Reformers.

After the election of Councillors on 26 December 1835 and the Aldermanic election in January 1836, the composition of the council was:

Election result

Ward results

* - Previously a member of the preceding Common Council

Everton and Kirkdale

The polling place for the township of Kirkdale was Mrs. Stretch's public house in Kirkdale Village.

The polling place for Everton township was Halliday's, Everton Coffee-house

Scotland

The Polling place was Mr. Horner's at the corner of Eccles-street and Vauxhall-road.

Vauxhall

The polling place was at the Vauxhall Vaults, corner of Banastre-street and Vauxhall-road.

St. Paul's

Polling place : At Mather's Baths, corner of St. Paul's-square and Virginia-street

Exchange

Polling places : Surnames A to K : at the south end of the Sessions'-house in South Chapel-street.							
Surnames L to Z : at the north end of the Sessions'-house in Chapel-street.

Castle Street

Polling place : At the two windows of the King's Arms Hotel fronting Castle-street

St. Peter's

Polling place : At the two windows of the Horse and Jockey public-house fronting Seel-street

Pitt Street

Polling place : At two compartments in the South Free School in Park-lane.

Great George

Polling place : At a warehouse, east side of St. James's-street, near the corner of St. Vincent-street.

Rodney Street

Polling place : A to K : at a new shop at the entrance of the New Arcade from Renshaw Street.								
L to Z : at a window of an empty-house, opposite the Unitarian Chapel, in Renshaw-street.

Abercromby

Polling place : At the Phoenix Inn, at the top of Mount Pleasant

Lime Street

Polling places : A to K : at a window in the Black Bell Inn, London-road.
L to Z : at a window in Challinor's Public-house, on the opposite side of London-road.

St. Anne Street

Polling place : At the Pontack's Public-house, in Christian-street.

West Derby

Polling place : At the Edge-hill Coffee-house.

South Toxteth

Polling place : At the southernmost of the Shops recently built by Dr. Hughes, on the west side of Park-road.

North Toxteth

Polling place : At two windows of the Royal Oak Public-house, at the corner of Upper Warwick-street and Park-place.

Aldermanic Elections

At the meeting of the Council in January 1836, sixteen Aldermen were elected by the Council,
eight for a term of six years and eight for a term of three years.

By-elections

No. 12, Lime Street, 7th January 1836

Caused by the disqualification of Joseph Langton (Reformers, Lime Street, elected 26 December 1835) because he did not sign the councillors' declaration. Mr. Langton was the manager of the Bank of Liverpool and the directors of the bank did not think him being a town councillor was compatible with his role as manager of the bank.

See also
Liverpool City Council
Liverpool Town Council elections 1835 - 1879
Liverpool City Council elections 1880–present
Mayors and Lord Mayors
of Liverpool 1207 to present
History of local government in England

References

1835
1835 English local elections
December 1835 events
1830s in Liverpool